BRAC may stand for:

Military
 Base Realignment and Closure for U.S. military bases
 1988 Base Realignment and Closure Commission
 1991 Base Realignment and Closure Commission
 1993 Base Realignment and Closure Commission
 1995 Base Realignment and Closure Commission
 2005 Base Realignment and Closure Commission

Organizations
 BRAC (organisation), an international development organization in Bangladesh
 Brotherhood of Railway and Airline Clerks, a labor union known as the Transportation Communications International Union
 Bureau for the Repression of Communist Activities, Cuban secret police agency
 Building Regulations Advisory Committee, of UK government

Other
 BRAC Bank Limited, a private commercial bank in Bangladesh
 BRAC University, in Bangladesh
 Basic rest-activity cycles of the brain
 Binding and Retrieval in Action Control, a theoretical framework to explain basic psychological functions
 Breath Alcohol Content (BrAC), a measure of alcohol intoxication; see 
 An alternative specification for countries in the BRIC list: Brazil, Russia, Australia, and Canada or China

See also
 Brac (disambiguation)
 Brač, an island in the Adriatic Sea within Croatia